Gracilosphya elongata is a species of beetle in the family Cerambycidae. It was described by Stephan von Breuning in 1948.

Subspecies
 Gracilosphya elongata elongata (Breuning, 1948)
 Gracilosphya elongata immaculata Dillon & Dillon, 1952
 Gracilosphya elongata suturalis Dillon & Dillon, 1952

References

Cyrtinini
Beetles described in 1948